Kokoda is a station town in the Oro Province of Papua New Guinea. It is famous as the northern end of the Kokoda Track, site of the eponymous Kokoda Track campaign of World War II. In that campaign, it had strategic significance because it had the only airfield along the Track. In the decades preceding, it had been a foothills settlement near the gold fields.

Kokoda is located within the administrative divisions of Kokoda Rural LLG.

Establishment of the station town
Before British colonisation in the late 19th century, the area around Kokoda was under the control of the Orokaiva people. In 1899 Henry Stuart-Russell was surveying a path from Port Moresby to the north coast of New Guinea and encountered Orokaiva in the upper reaches of the Kumusi and Mambare Rivers who opposed his presence. His party subsequently shot down numerous local people. Stuart-Russell also found signs of gold, which encouraged British and Anglo-Australian miners to enter the area. The entry of these miners caused further conflict and death on both sides and the British paramilitary force in New Guinea known as the Native Constabulary was ordered in to enforce colonial rule.

William Edington Armit, the Resident Magistrate of the region, arrived with his troopers, killing 17 people in one village and another 24 people in subsequent patrols. He had the aim of preventing the survivors from returning to their villages for two years. Armit had previously served as an officer in the brutal Native Police based in Queensland. He died from fever not long after these punitive missions and was said to have used crucified captives for target practice while in New Guinea.

In 1901, after Armit's death, further patrols were led by his replacement in Alexander Elliot. Elliot and his troopers shot dead forty Orokaiva and left another 17 with broken legs while avenging the killings of two white miners. Elliot was warned by his superiors not to describe the killing of "natives" in "sporting parlance" in his reports. The British found that a base for colonial control was required to subdue the region and the government station of Kokoda was founded in 1904. Government officer Henry Griffin forced local people to become labourers and carriers to construct the town and build roads in the region. If they refused, Griffin would order his troopers to shoot their pigs and steal their taro plants. From Kokoda, the British and Anglo-Australian forces were able to subdue the Orokaiva and neighbouring peoples.

World War II
An amphibious landing by Japanese forces to capture Port Moresby was postponed indefinitely after the Battle of Midway. The Japanese command believed there to be a road leading through the Owen-Stanleys from Kokoda to the south coast. An invasion force was landed on the north coast near Buna and Gona from 21 July 1942. Two battles were fought in and around the village during the opening stages of the Kokoda Track campaign. Kokoda was reoccupied by Australian forces on 2 November 1942, following the Japanese withdrawal back to the north coast.

The station is linked by a rough road and a two-hour journey to the provincial capital of Popondetta.

In August 2009 Kokoda airstrip was the destination for Airlines PNG Flight CG4684 that crashed whilst attempting to land. All 13 people on board were killed in the crash, including nine Australian passengers who were due to trek the Kokoda Track, a Japanese passenger, and three Papua New Guineans, including the two pilots.

Climate
Kokoda has a tropical rainforest climate with heavy to very heavy rainfall year-round.

See also

 Kokoda Rural LLG
 Kokoda Track campaign
 New Guinea campaign
 Kokoda Memorial Hospital

References

 
Populated places in Oro Province